is a railway station in Ōkawa-machi Ōkawano, Imari, Saga Prefecture, Japan. It is operated by JR Kyushu and is on the Chikuhi Line.

Lines
Besides the terminal at Yamamoto, the station is the only place on this section of line with a passing loop which allows trains travelling in opposite directions to pass each other.

Station layout 
The station, which is unstaffed, consists of an island platform serving two tracks at grade. The station building, built in 2006, is a timber structure in traditional Japanese style with a skylight. It serves as a waiting room as well as a local community facility. Access to the island platform is by means of a level crossing.

Adjacent stations

History
This station was opened on the same day as an intermediate station on the new track. The Kitakyushi Railway was nationalised on 1 October 1937 and Japanese Government Railways (JGR) assumed control of the station and designated the track which served it as part of the Chikuhi Line. With the privatization of Japanese National Railways (JNR), the successor of JGR, on 1 April 1987, control of the station passed to JR Kyushu.

The new building serves as a waiting room for the station and also doubles as a community facility, featuring rooms which can be rented for meetings, and an exhibition space with displays about the history and the economy of the region.

Passenger statistics
In fiscal 2015, there were a total of 14,883 boarding passengers, giving a daily average of 41 passengers.

References

External links
Ōkawano (JR Kyushu)

Railway stations in Japan opened in 1935
Chikuhi Line
Railway stations in Saga Prefecture
Stations of Kyushu Railway Company